Jezero, meaning 'lake' in several Slavic languages, may refer to:

Places

Earth

Bosnia and Herzegovina 
 Jezero, Bosnia and Herzegovina
 Jezero, Bihać
 Jezero, Kakanj
 Jezero, Kalinovik
 Jezero, Konjic

Croatia 
 
 
 Jezero Klanječko
 Jezero Posavsko

Serbia 
 Jezero (Despotovac)
 Jezero, Sjenica
 Jezero, Sokobanja

Slovenia 
 Jezero, Brezovica
 Jezero, Trebnje

Mars
 Jezero (crater)

Football clubs 
 FK Jezero, a Montenegrin football club
 NK Jezero Medvode, a Slovenian football club

See also 
 Jezera (disambiguation)